The 2001 ICC Trophy was a cricket tournament played in Ontario, Canada in 2001. It was the Cricket World Cup qualification tournament for the 2003 Cricket World Cup. Three spots in the World Cup were on offer and the Netherlands, host nation Canada and for the first time, Namibia all qualified. Scotland failed to qualify losing in the 3rd place play off and finishing fourth. The Netherlands won the final against Namibia.

Bangladesh had, by then, been promoted to full Test and ODI status, and so did not take part in this competition, and Kenya had gained full ODI status also didn't take part, and as a result both countries qualified for the 2003 Cricket World Cup automatically.

Squads

Group stage

The first round group stage saw a unique two division format, designed to eliminate the mismatches that had blighted previous ICC Trophy tournaments. Each division had two groups of six teams, making 24 teams in total. 

However, Italy withdrew before the tournament started to protest  Joe Scuderi being ruled ineligible despite being an Italian citizen. West Africa also withdrew, leaving one of the Division Two groups with just four teams, after Canadian immigration officials refused the West African team entry into the country due to concerns the players, especially from Sierra Leone, would stay in Canada illegally after the tournament.

The top three teams from the first round Division One groups went through to the Super League stage, whilst the fourth place team in each group played off against the winners of the Division Two groups.

Points Tables

Play off stage

In the first play off, Bermuda played the winners of Division Two, Group A, Namibia. Namibia batted first and scored 221, then bowled Bermuda out for 146 for a 75 run win, and qualification for the Super League. In the other play-off, the UAE beat Uganda.

Super League

Finals

3rd-place play-off
The third-place play-off determined the fourteenth and final team at the 2003 World Cup.

Final

Statistics

Most runs
The top five run scorers (total runs) are included in this table.

Source: CricketArchive

Most wickets

The top five wicket takers are listed in this table, listed by wickets taken and then by bowling average.

Source: CricketArchive

See also

ICC Trophy
2003 Cricket World Cup

References

2001 ICC Trophy page at Cricket Archive

International cricket competitions in Canada
Canadian cricket in the 21st century
Icc Trophy, 2001
ICC World Cup Qualifier
2001 in Canadian cricket
2001 in Ontario